Glyphodes inclusalis is a moth in the family Crambidae. It was described by Max Gaede in 1917. It is found in Tanzania.

References

Moths described in 1917
Glyphodes